Christian Gottlieb Jöcher (20 July 1694 – 10 May 1758) was a German academic, librarian and lexicographer.

Jöcher was born in Leipzig, and became professor of history at the University of Leipzig in 1732. From 1742, he was university librarian in the Leipzig University Library, where he began the complete alphabetic catalogue of the collections.

He authored the Allgemeines Gelehrten-Lexicon ("General Dictionary of the Learned") in four volumes, published 1733-1751, and was editor of the literary journal Deutsche Acta Eruditorum from 1719.  He died in Leipzig.

Work
 Compendiöses Gelehrten-Lexicon: Darinne die Gelehrten aller Stände so wohl männ- als weiblichen Geschlechts, welche vom Anfang der Welt bis auf ietztige Zeit gelebt, und sich der gelehrten Welt bekannt gemacht, nach ihrer Geburt, Absterben, Schrifften, Leben und merckwürdigen Geschichten aus denen glaubwürdigsten Scribenten nach dem Entwurff des sel. D. Joh. Burckh. Menckens in alphabetischer Ordnung beschrieben werden. In zwei Theilen. Die dritte Auflage heraus gegeben von Christian Gottlieb Jöcher, Leipzig 1733

Literature
 Cole, Richard Glenn. “The Art of History and Eighteenth-Century Information Management: Christian Gottlieb Jöcher and Johann Heinrich Zedler.” The Library Quarterly: Information, Community, Policy 83, no. 1 (2013): 26–38. https://doi.org/10.1086/668573.

External links
 Christian Gottlieb Jöcher und das Gelehrten-Lexikon 

1684 births
1758 deaths
German librarians
German lexicographers
German male non-fiction writers
Writers from Leipzig
18th-century lexicographers